During the 2005–06 season, West Bromwich Albion competed in the FA Premier League.

Season summary
Despite attaining FA Premier League survival on the final day of the previous season, this time West Brom were unable to repeat their "great escape" and were relegated to the Championship. West Brom had spent much of the season just ahead of the relegation zone, but Portsmouth's late run of good form – in addition to West Brom failing to win any of their final 13 fixtures – dragged the Midlanders into the relegation places.

Kit
West Brom retained their kit manufacturing agreement with Diadora, who introduced a new kit for the season. T-Mobile remained the kit sponsors.

Final league table

Results
West Bromwich Albion's score comes first

Legend

FA Premier League

FA Cup

League Cup

Players

First-team squad
Squad at end of season

Left club during season

Transfers

In

Out

Statistics

Starting 11
Considering starts in all competitions

Notes

References

West Bromwich Albion F.C. seasons
West Brom